Jack Laird (born Jack Laird Schultheis; May 8, 1923 – December 3, 1991) was an American screenwriter, producer, director, and actor. He received three Primetime Emmy Award nominations for his works in Ben Casey, Night Gallery, and Kojak.

Early life
Laird was born on May 8, 1923 in Monrovia, California to Leonard Schultheis, a businessman, and Thelma Laird, a Theater Director who taught night school dramatics, and from whom Laird took classes, in his high school years he was art editor of the school newspaper, while a student at Pasadena Junior College, Laird formed his dance band "Aris Laird and his ARIStocrats of Swing", the group was made up of players who later joined the likes of Stan Kenton, Benny Goodman, and Les Brown, the band broke up when Laird enlisted in the Army Air Force during World War II, he was assigned as a pilot in the Ninth Air Force, he served with the First Allied Airborne while stationed in Manchester, England.

Career
Laird entered the entertainment industry at a young age. One of his first appearances as a child actor was in an unbilled bit part in the 1934 film The Circus Clown. After his discharge from the army, Laird resumed civilian life in New York, where he enrolled at the Dramatic Workshop and studied playwriting under John Gassner, he returned to Hollywood for a screen test and ultimately starred in a series of movie and radio roles, including the radio crime drama This Is Your FBI, his television appearances include episodes of Fireside Theatre, Ben Casey and Ironside. He eventually moved into writing and producing, writing for various television shows, such as The Lone Ranger, The Millionaire, M Squad, Highway Patrol, Private Secretary, The Alfred Hitchcock Hour, Ford Theatre, The Wild Wild West, The Ann Sothern Show, Mr. District Attorney, and Have Gun – Will Travel. Laird distinguished himself as a writer and story editor on the medical show Ben Casey, eventually becoming an associate producer, he would receive an Emmy nomination in 1962 for his work on the Episode "I Remember a Lemon Tree", he then went on to write and produce independent projects for Universal Studio. In the 1970s, Laird came into his own as a Writer, Director, and Producer, working on such shows as The Psychiatrist, Night Gallery, Kojak, and many more.

One of Laird's favorite actors was Leslie Nielsen with whom he made several made-for-TV movies, including 1964's See How They Run, the first feature in that genre, Code Name: Heraclitus, Dark Intruder, The Return of Charlie Chan and numerous TV episodes. Nielsen also starred in a series produced by Laird was evidently an admirer of horror writer H.P. Lovecraft. He based at least two episodes of Night Gallery on Lovecraft's work - "Pickman's Model" (based directly on the Lovecraft story of the same title Pickman's Model) and "Professor Peabody's Last Lecture". The dialogue of the 1965 horror movie Dark Intruder, produced by Laird, includes some references to alien beings invented by Lovecraft, tying the film to Lovecraft's Cthulhu Mythos. In an early scene where Brett Kingsford meets with the police commissioner, opines that "gods older than the human race...deities like Dagon and Azathoth still have worshippers."

Personal life
On January 17, 1948, Laird married his first wife, actress Cicely Ann Browne, but due to their careers, the marriage ended, Browne retained custody of their son, Sean. On February 22, 1959, Laird married his second wife, Peggy Jackson, a young stage actress who would later appear on the medical show Ben Casey as Nurse Van Buren, they had a daughter, Sharon, after five years, Jackson and Laird divorced. In November 1964, Laird married his third wife, Jeri Emmett, a former Playboy Bunny turned writer, they had a daughter, Persephone, through his marriage to Emmett, Laird would become step-father to her other children, Kurtis, Michael, and Journey, Emmett had written a few episodes for such television shows as, The Fugitive, Iron Horse, The Bold Ones: The Protectors (under the name Betty Deveraux), and Mannix, as well as a Television Series Treatment called "Confessions of a Den Mother", and a book about her days working at the playboy club called "Point Your Tail in The Right Direction".

He was an avid film collector and jazz fan.

Death
Laird died of heart disease on December 3, 1991 in Los Angeles at the age of 68. His final resting place in Hollywood Forever Cemetery is in the "Garden of Legends" (formerly Section 8), Lot 266. His grave is next to the cenotaph of actress Jayne Mansfield.

Filmography

Films

Television

Unproduced Projects 
Throughout his career Jack Laird had a number of projects that were never produced or broadcast:

 From The 1950's to the 1960s, Laird wrote several spec scripts, which included, "Red Wolf Crossing", which was an adaptation of the Will Henry novel "To Follow a Flag", "A God In A Garden", which was based on an original story by Theodore Sturgeon, "An Extenuating Circumstance", a screenplay Laird co-wrote with Charles F. Haas, that was adapted from the story "A Coward" By Guy de Maupassant, "The Steel Trap", which was based on a story by William T. Orr, "Three Marked Pennies", which was based on a story By Mary Elizabeth Counselman, "Four Cornered Triangle" an original screenplay Laird wrote, "A Day Off", which was based on a story By Walter Gilkyson, he was also set to produce five projects, "Crime! Pleasant Dreams Sweet Celia", a screenplay written by Gene R. Kearney, "Out Of The Darkness", a screenplay written by Barré Lyndon and Alvin Sapinsley, "Fires, Bombs, and Patriots", a screenplay written by Abby Mann, "The Invisible Man", based on the H.G. Wells novel of the same name that was adapted by Howard Rodman, and "The Other Place", a screenplay written by Theodore Sturgeon.
 In early 1967, Laird and Herman Miller had written an early draft of Coogan's Bluff.
 In 1969, Laird was attached to two film projects that were never produced, "The Richest Hill On Earth" which was written by Halsted Welles (Based on a treatment by Laird), and "Unit Theta", which was written by Wilton Schiller.
 From the 1950s to the 1980s, Laird had written or had developed several Television Series Treatments that were never picked up called "Daniel Boone: The Gun Runners", "Talmadge", "Brute Force", "Atonement", "...& Cucamonga", "E.Z. Wheeler: Ex-Cop", "In The Name Of The Law", "Newsroom", "Code Name: Damocles" "Senior Year", "The Lorne Greene Project", and "Tokatyan".
 At the time of his death, Laird was working on a television series based on stories by thriller writer Robert Ludlum
 In 1967, he created an unsold comedy pilot, The Return of the Original Yellow Tornado, about two elderly, retired superheroes Mickey Rooney is the original Yellow Tornado and Eddie Mayehoff is his retired sidekick who must once again don their leotards to do battle with a super-villain who has been set free and has vowed to destroy the world. The pilot was eventually expanded to a film-that was never released.
 In 1972, he worked as producer on one of the pilot episodes produced for Biography, an unsold TV series. Four pilots were completed and eventually appeared as TV movies, but Laird's episode about Houdini was never filmed.
 In the 1970s, Laird was attached to several film projects, a spec script he had written called "Hotel Imperial - Tokyo", which was based on an original story by Alan Lee, "Mantrap", a spec script he co-wrote with Wilton Schiller, "The Broken-Field Runner", a screenplay written by Fred Segal, which Laird was going to produce.
 In 1988, Laird wrote a spec script that was called "Suffer The Little Children".

References

External links
 
Jack Laird @ thetvdb.com

American television writers
American male television writers
Television producers from California
American television directors
American male film actors
American male television actors
Writers from Los Angeles
1923 births
1991 deaths
Deaths from cancer in California
20th-century American male actors
20th-century American businesspeople
Screenwriters from California
20th-century American screenwriters
20th-century American male writers